Below are the names and numbers of the steam locomotives that comprised the LNER Class D49, that ran on the London and North Eastern Railway network. The class names came from English and Scottish counties for the early locomotives, and fox hunts for the later locomotives. 

Most names were local to the areas of Scotland and the North of England  where the locomotives were based, but some were out of area, while a few were nowhere near the LNER network.

Notes
D49/1 (Part 1) locomotives were built with  piston valves,  activated by Walschaerts valve gear for the outside cylinders, and Gresley conjugated valve gear for the inside cylinder.

D49/3 (Part 3) locomotives were built with Lentz oscillating poppet valves  activated by Walschaerts valve gear. All were later rebuilt to D49/1 valve gear arrangements.

D49/2 (Part 2) locomotives were built with Lentz poppet valves activated by rotary cams.

References

D49/9
4-4-0 locomotives
Railway locomotives introduced in 1927
British railway-related lists